The Baseball Factory Field at UMBC is a baseball field located on the campus of the University of Maryland, Baltimore County in Catonsville, Maryland, United States.  The field is home to the UMBC Retrievers baseball team of the NCAA Division I America East Conference.  The field is located adjacent to UMBC Stadium.  It has a capacity of 1,000 spectators.  Previously known as Alumni Field, the venue was renamed on April 20, 2004, after the university's agreement with player development company Baseball Factory. Prior to the 2004 season, the field underwent a $350,000 renovation which added a new lighting system, playing surface, and warning track. Since 2004, the facility's press box, dugout, and bleachers were upgraded.

See also
 List of NCAA Division I baseball venues

References

External links
 Alumni Field

College baseball venues in the United States
Baseball venues in Maryland
UMBC Retrievers baseball
Sports venues in the Baltimore metropolitan area